Férré Grignard (stylized: FĒRRĒ GRIGNARD) is Belgian singer-songwriter Ferre Grignard's third solo album. Released in 1972, it was a significant departure from the psychedelic nature of the last album, Captain Disaster.

Track list

Personnel
Ferre Grignard: vocals, guitar
Emilius Fingertips: washboard
Derroll Adams: banjo
Gilles Papiri: bass
François Auger: drums
George Toet Smits: guitar, harmonica
Slim Pezin: lead guitar
Koen de Bruyn: piano

References

External links
Discogs.com entry

Ferre Grignard albums
1972 albums